Katrine Lunde (former Haraldsen; born 30 March 1980) is a Norwegian handball goalkeeper for Vipers Kristiansand and the Norwegian national team.

She is the twin sister of fellow handball player Kristine Lunde-Borgersen. Her sporting achievements include gold medals with the Norwegian national team at the Olympic Games, World Championships and European Championships, as well as club victories in the EHF Champions League, and national championships in Denmark, Hungary, Russia and Norway.

Career

Club
She started her club career in Hånes, and later played for Kristiansand, Våg and Aalborg DH. She won the Champions League with Viborg in 2009 and 2010. In 2010, she signed with Hungarian club Győri Audi ETO KC. In 2015, she signed with Russian club Rostov-Don. After two years spent in Russia she returned to Norway. Her contract with Vipers Kristiansand is valid until 2025.

International
Lunde made her debut on the Norwegian national team in 2002. She is a six-time European champion (2004, 2006, 2008, 2010, 2020, 2022). She is World champion from 2011, received a silver medal at the 2007 World Women's Handball Championship, and a bronze medal at the 2009 World Championship. In August 2008, together with her twin sister, she won the gold medal at the 2008 Summer Olympics in Beijing. She was selected into the tournament's All-Star Team, and was also overall top goalkeeper with a 42% save rate.

Lunde was again named goalkeeper of the All-Star Team in the 2008 European Championship and ranked second on the Top Goalkeepers list with a 47% save rate.

She was also part of the Norwegian team that won the gold medal at the 2012 Summer Olympics.

Lunde has participated in 19 international championships for the national team.

Achievements
Olympic Games:
Winner: 2008, 2012
Bronze Medalist: 2016, 2020
World Championship:
Winner: 2011, 2021
Silver Medalist: 2007, 2017
Bronze Medalist: 2009
European Championship:
Winner: 2004, 2006, 2008, 2010, 2020, 2022
Silver Medalist: 2002, 2012
Damehåndboldligaen:
Winner: 2008, 2009, 2010
Silver Medalist: 2005
Bronze Medalist: 2006, 2007
DHF Landspokalturneringen:
Winner: 2007, 2008
Nemzeti Bajnokság I:
Winner: 2011, 2012, 2013, 2014
Silver Medalist: 2015
Magyar Kupa:
Winner: 2011, 2012, 2013, 2014, 2015
EHF Champions League:
Winner: 2009, 2010, 2013, 2014, 2021, 2022
Finalist: 2012
Bronze Medalist: 2019
Semifinalist: 2006, 2011
EHF Cup:
Winner: 2017
Finalist: 2018
Semifinalist: 2004
Norwegian League:
Winner: 2017/2018, 2018/2019, 2019/2020, 2020/2021, 2021/2022
Norwegian Cup:
Winner: 2017, 2018, 2019, 2020, 2021, 2022/23

Individual awards
 All-Star Goalkeeper of the Olympic Games: 2008, 2020
 All-Star Goalkeeper of the European Championship: 2008, 2010, 2012
 Foreign Handballer of the Year in Hungary: 2013 
 All-Star Goalkeeper of the World Championship: 2017
 All-Star Goalkeeper of the Champions League: 2019
 All-Star Goalkeeper of Eliteserien: 2018/2019, 2020/2021, 2021/2022,

References

External links

 
 
 Katrine Lunde at the Norwegian Handball Federation 
 
 

1980 births
Living people
Norwegian female handball players
Sportspeople from Kristiansand
Handball players at the 2008 Summer Olympics
Handball players at the 2012 Summer Olympics
Handball players at the 2016 Summer Olympics
Olympic handball players of Norway
Olympic gold medalists for Norway
Olympic bronze medalists for Norway
Olympic medalists in handball
Expatriate handball players
Norwegian expatriate sportspeople in Denmark
Norwegian expatriate sportspeople in Hungary
Norwegian expatriate sportspeople in Russia
Győri Audi ETO KC players
Norwegian twins
Twin sportspeople
Identical twins
Medalists at the 2008 Summer Olympics
Medalists at the 2012 Summer Olympics
Medalists at the 2016 Summer Olympics
Medalists at the 2020 Summer Olympics
Viborg HK players
Handball players at the 2020 Summer Olympics
21st-century Norwegian women